Marie Eliane Saholinirina (born 20 March 1983 in Betsihaka) is a Malagasy athlete who specialises in the 3000 metres steeplechase. She competed for Madagascar at the 2012 Summer Olympics failing to qualify for the semifinals.

She competed in the 3000 m steeplechase at the 2016 Summer Olympics in Rio de Janeiro. She finished 11th in her heat with a time of 9:45.92 and did not qualify for the final. She was the flagbearer for Madagascar during the Parade of Nations.

Competition record

Personal bests
Outdoor
800 metres – 2:06.57 (Osaka 2007)
1500 metres – 4:15.13 (Oordegem (Bel) 2016)
3000 metres steeplechase – 9:44.50 (Durban 2016)
Indoor
800 metres – 2:09.39 (Eaubonne 2010)
1000 metres – 2:46.22 (Eaubonne 2012)
1500 metres – 4:19.64 (Sopot 2014)

References 

1983 births
Living people
Malagasy female middle-distance runners
Malagasy steeplechase runners
Olympic athletes of Madagascar
Athletes (track and field) at the 2012 Summer Olympics
Athletes (track and field) at the 2016 Summer Olympics
People from Diana Region
World Athletics Championships athletes for Madagascar
Female steeplechase runners
Athletes (track and field) at the 2007 All-Africa Games
African Games competitors for Madagascar